Gilbert Omnès (22 June 1918 – 1 September 1970) was a French hurdler. He competed in the men's 110 metres hurdles at the 1948 Summer Olympics.

References

External links
 

1918 births
1970 deaths
Athletes (track and field) at the 1948 Summer Olympics
French male hurdlers
Olympic athletes of France
Place of birth missing
20th-century French people